The Los Patos river and village are located in the Barahona Province of the Dominican Republic, near the town of Paraíso. With just 61 meters — depending on the tide — it is the shortest river on the island and among the shortest rivers in the world.

The village itself lives from fishing and local tourism. On the weekends the river is a popular bathing spot due to its cold temperatures. The name Los Patos (the ducks) is derived from the unusual large amount of ducks early explorers encountered at this specific river. For a long time the ducks of Los Patos were extinct, until the local tourism board brought in a large amount of Muscovy ducks to re-populate the river. Dominican dictator Rafael Trujillo, once nicknamed it "Los Chorros De Oro."

References

Populated places in Barahona Province